The Gymnasium of Lithuanian University of Health Sciences is a private school in the Vilijampolė district of Kaunas, Lithuania. It is owned by the Lithuanian University of Health Sciences.

History 
On 20 December 2012, Kaunas city municipality decided to transfer the building of the liquidated Vilijampolė school to the Lithuanian University of Health Sciences. On 6 March 2013, the school was legally registered. In the spring of 2013, the school building went under reconstruction. On 1 September 2013, the school was opened. In September 2015 Secondary school of Lithuanian University of Health Sciences was accredited as Gymnasium of Lithuanian University of Health Sciences.

References

External links 
lsmugimnazija.lt
lsmuni.lt

Lith
Secondary schools in Lithuania
2013 establishments in Lithuania
Educational institutions established in 2013